Lisa Limone and Maroc Orange: A Rapid Love Story is a 2013 Estonian stop motion animated romantic musical film directed by Mait Laas, from a screenplay by Kati Kovács and Peep Pedmanson. Produced by Nukufilm, Ülo Krigul composed the soundtrack. It was released in Estonian cinemas on 8 March 2013.

Premise 
Maroc, a singing orange, escapes from North Africa and arrives in Estonian in hope of finding a better homeland. But once arriving he is forced to become a wage slave in a tomato plantation. However, a lemon named Lisa falls in love with him and helps to set him free.

Voice cast 
The Estonian voice cast is as follows:
Omar Nõmm as Maroc the orange
Iiris Vesik as Lisa Limone the lemon
Peeter Volkonski as Lisa's dad
Risto Joost as Clam

Production 
According to director Mait Laas, production lasted six years. It took "almost two years to make the puppets and decorations," while filming lasted three years and the sound effects were added a year later. The puppets were moved millimeter at a time.

Soundtrack 
The soundtrack was composed by Ülo Krigul. Many of the songs in the film were sung in the native languages of the characters, including French for Maroc and the oranges, Italian for Lisa and the lemons, and English.

References

External links 
 (in Estonian)

2013 animated films
2010s stop-motion animated films
Estonian animated films
Estonian-language films
Estonian multilingual films
Estonian children's films
Estonian musical films